Chaos Moon is an American black metal band formed by Alex Poole in 2004. It started out as a one-man Funeral Doom project in Nashville, Tennessee. Their first full album, Origin Of Apparition, was released in 2007. In the beginning, Alex Poole was responsible for playing every instrument. However, as the years passed, other members joined including Eric Baker on vocals, Steven Blackburn on guitars, and Jack Blackburn on drums.

Their best-reviewed album to date is Eschaton Mémoire (2017) which Spyros Stasis of PopMatters says, "It might have taken a while for Chaos Moon to reach this state, a surprising result considering how potent and promising the two early records of the band were. From these diamonds in the rough, Chaos Moon has further explored its sound, and with Eschaton Memoire Poole and company have reached the summit."

Discography

Studio album 
 Origin Of Apparition (2007) - Released on Wraith Productions
 Languor Into Echoes, Beyond (2007) - Released on Ars Magna Recordings 
 Resurrection Extract (2014) - Released on I, Voidhanger Records
 Eschaton Mémoire (2017) - Released on Blood Music

EP 
 The Ouroboros Worm (2011) - Released on Plastik Musik
 Plaguebearer's Gift (2013)  
 Amissum (2015) - Released on Hellthrasher Productions

Members 
 Alex Poole – guitar
 Eric Baker - vocals
 Steven Blackburn – guitar
 Jack Blackburn – drums

References

External links 
 "Chaos Moon". Invisible Oranges.
 "Chaos Moon". Indy Metal Vault.
 "Chaos Moon". Decibel.
 "Chaos Moon". Metal Storm.

American black metal musical groups